Tennis at the 2010 Summer Youth Olympics lasted from August 18 until August 25. For the Singles competitions, all matches were determined through a best-of-three tie-break sets. For the Doubles competitions, all matches were determined by two tie-break sets and a match tie-break game (10 points) in place of a third set. There were competitions for boys' singles, boys' doubles, girls' singles and girls' doubles. It took place at the Kallang Tennis Centre.

The acceptance lists for the event were released by the International Tennis Federation (ITF) on 29 June. 39 countries are represented in the event that involves both 32 players for the singles and 16 pairs for the doubles.

Each National Olympic Committee (NOC) could submit a maximum of 2 boys and 2 girls to compete in both the singles and doubles events. 12 places in the singles events were given out based on a player's junior world ranking. 16 places were given out based on ranking by region, with the remaining four positions allocated by the IOC or given to the next highest ranked player.

Qualifiers

Boys' singles

Girls' singles

Calendar

Medal summary

Medal table

Events

References

 
2010 Summer Youth Olympics events
2010 in tennis
2010
Tennis tournaments in Singapore
Kallang